Kevin Li may refer to:

 Kevin Li (badminton) (born 1986), Canadian badminton player
 Kevin K. Li (born 1978), Canadian television producer
 Li Zhenning (born 1995), or Kevin Li Zhenning, Chinese singer and actor
 Kris Wu (born 1990), formerly known as Kevin Li, Chinese-Canadian singer and actor